The 1999 Columbia Lions football team was an American football team that represented Columbia University during the 1999 NCAA Division I-AA football season. Columbia tied for last in the Ivy League. 

In their 11th season under head coach Ray Tellier, the Lions compiled a 3–7 record and were outscored 301 to 175. Jason Bivens, Justin Meadlin, Matt Radley and Jon Sproul were the team captains.  

The Lions' 1–6 conference record tied for seventh in the Ivy League standings. Columbia was outscored 141 to 95 by Ivy opponents. 

Columbia played its homes games at Lawrence A. Wien Stadium in Upper Manhattan, in New York City.

Schedule

References

Columbia
Columbia Lions football seasons
Columbia Lions football